Washington College is a private liberal arts college in Chestertown, Maryland. Maryland granted Washington College its charter in 1782. George Washington supported the founding of the college by consenting to have the "College at Chester" named in his honor, through generous financial support, and through service on the college's Board of Visitors and Governors. Washington College is the 10th-oldest college in the United States and was the first college chartered after American independence. The school became coeducational in 1891.

History

Washington College evolved from the Kent County Free School, an institution of more than 200 years' standing in "Chester Town," which by the college's founding date of 1782 had reached considerable strength and importance as a port city. George Washington consented to the fledgling college's use of his name, pledged the sum of 50 guineas to its establishment, and extended his warm wishes for the "lasting and extensive usefulness" of the institution. He later served on Washington College's Board of Visitors and Governors — his only such involvement with an institution of higher learning.

The college's first president, the Reverend William Smith, was a prominent figure in colonial affairs of letters and church, and he had a wide acquaintance among the great men of colonial days, including Benjamin Franklin. Joining General Washington on the Board of Visitors and Governors of the new college were such distinguished figures as U.S. Senator John Henry, Congressman Joshua Seney and William Paca, Governor of Maryland. The Maryland legislature granted its first college charter upon Washington College in May 1782. The following spring, on May 14, 1783, the college held its first commencement.

President Smith had envisaged Washington College as the Eastern Shore Campus of a public “University of Maryland” with St. John's College as its Western Shore counterpart, a proposal incorporated into the later institution's 1784 state charter, but the Maryland General Assembly's reluctance to provide funding meant this was never more than a paper institution and the relationship ended with Smith's return to Philadelphia in 1789.

With his election as first President of the United States, General Washington retired from the Board of Visitors and Governors and accepted the honorary degree of doctor of laws, which a delegation from Chestertown presented to him on June 24, 1789, in New York, then the seat of Congress. Since Washington's last visit to campus, Washington College has hosted five U.S. presidents: Franklin Delano Roosevelt, Harry S Truman, Dwight Eisenhower, John F. Kennedy and George H. W. Bush.

The original college building cornerstone was laid in May 1783, it opened in 1788 after selling off acreage and starting a lottery to fund the project. The hall was still incomplete by 1794 and was destroyed by a basement fire January 11, 1827. The oldest existing building, Middle Hall, was erected in 1844 on the site of the original college building. By 1860, Middle Hall was joined by East and West Halls. All three structures, known as the Hill Dorms, are on the Maryland Register of Historic Places.

Academics

Student body and admissions

Washington College offers 34 majors, and 35 minors or concentrations. The most popular majors, based on 2021 graduates, were:
Business Administration & Management (36)
Psychology (36)
Biology/Biological Sciences (32)
Economics (21)
English Language & Literature (18)
Political Science & Government (16)

1,367 undergraduate students attended Washington College during the 2018–2019 academic year along with approximately 100 graduate students. During that year, 74% of applicants were accepted. (The acceptance rate for 2018–2019 was much higher than in previous years, likely due to the drop in total applications for the 2018–2019 academic year. Washington College received 5,515 applications for 2017–2018 and 3,109 for 2018–2019.) For the 2017–2018 academic year, the acceptance rate was 47%. The mean high school GPA of admitted students has risen from 3.53 in Fall 2013 to 3.62 in Fall 2018.

During the 2018–2019 academic year, 40.6 percent of incoming freshmen were from Maryland and the balance many other US states and 23 foreign nations. 18.8 percent of undergraduates are minority students with 9.2 percent identifying as African-American, 5.6 percent identifying as Hispanic-American, 3.2 percent identifying as Asian-American, and with .8 percent identifying as either Native American or Pacific Islander. 7.4 percent of undergraduates are international citizens. Approximately 5 percent of the college's student body is "non-traditional" (25 years old or older). 83% of students lived in an on-campus residence during the 2018 Fall term; the rest commute either from off-campus housing or from home.

Tuition for the 2020–2021 year is $48,678 and total expenses per annum (including room, board, and mandatory student fees) are $62,806.  During the 2018–2019 academic year, 99.4 percent of incoming freshmen received financial aid, along with 95.0 percent of all undergraduates. The cost of attendance has been rising in recent years, with the overall costs (including room and board) increasing by roughly $2,000 per year.

Rankings
In 2015, Washington College was ranked by The Princeton Review as 16th in the United States among "Colleges With The Happiest Students In 2015–16". In the 2011 edition of U.S. News & World Report Best Colleges, Washington College rose 19 positions to 93rd in the nation in the National Liberal Arts Colleges category.

Literary prizes
Each year, Washington College awards the nation's largest undergraduate literary prize. Since 1968, the Sophie Kerr Prize has been presented to one graduating senior who demonstrates the greatest literary promise. The endowment created by Sophie Kerr, a writer who published 23 novels and dozens of short stories, has provided more than $1.4 million in prize money to young writers.  At a ceremony held at the Poets House in New York City on May 17, 2011, Lisa Jones was selected as the winner of the $61,000 Sophie Kerr Prize.

In 2005, Washington College inaugurated another literary prize, the George Washington Book Prize, administered by the college's C.V. Starr Center for the Study of the American Experience and awarded in partnership with the Gilder Lehrman Institute of American History and George Washington's Mount Vernon. The prize is awarded annually to the most significant new book about the founding era. At $50,000, the prize is one of the most generous book awards in the United States. Richard Beeman won the 2010 George Washington Book Prize for his work, Plain, Honest Men: The Making of the American Constitution.

In 2015 the Rose O’Neill Literary House, Washington College's center for literature and the literary arts, established the Douglass Wallop Fellowship as a nationwide competition, with the first fellowship going to playwright Sheri Wilner.   The award will be granted biennially to a playwright.

Student life
The school has over 90 student clubs.

Freshmen, unless local, are required to live on-campus.  On-campus housing is available for approximately 900 students. Most students (70–75 percent) stay on-campus over the weekend to participate in various social and recreational activities.

Approximately 30 percent of students attend graduate school in the first year following graduation and approximately 45 percent do so within five years.

In Fall 2018, the student to faculty ratio was 10.5:1. The average class size is 17.

The school confers the degrees of Bachelor of Arts, Bachelor of Science, and Master of Arts (in English, psychology and history).

Washington College has joined American College & University Presidents Climate Commitment with a Campus carbon neutrality goal. The Center for Environment and Society oversees the Chesapeake Semester program, four interdisciplinary courses that use the college's location in the Chesapeake Bay watershed to explore environmental issues and advocacy.

Washington College is host to the Harwood Series, which includes speeches by national politicians and media pundits. Because of its reputation as a liberal arts school with creative writing being a strength, writers such as John Barth, Ray Bradbury, Bobbie Ann Mason, Colum McCann, Neil Gaiman, Tim O'Brien, Junot Diaz, Lawrence Ferlinghetti, and Robert Pinsky have given readings at the campus.

Greek life

Greek life at Washington College comprises four men's fraternities and three women's sororities. Approximately 25 percent of the student body joins Greek life. Fraternities are mainly housed on the "quad", and sororities line the Western Shore housing.

Men's fraternities:
Kappa Sigma Omicron-Phi – Chartered April 14, 2007
Phi Delta Theta MD Gamma – Chartered April 25, 1992

Sororities:
Alpha Chi Omega Beta Pi – Chartered May 21, 1937
Alpha Omicron Pi Sigma Tau – Chartered May 14, 1938
Zeta Tau Alpha  Gamma Beta – Chartered April 30, 1938

Traditions

George Washington Birthday Ball: A college-wide dance where students, faculty, staff, alumni, and friends of the college come together to celebrate George Washington's birthday. The event usually takes place on, or around, the actual date of George Washington's birth.

War on the Shore: The annual men's lacrosse game, held in late spring between Washington College and Salisbury University, two of Maryland's Eastern Shore's undergraduate schools.  Beginning in 2004, the winner of the game has been awarded the Charles B. Clark Cup.

May Day: Started in 1968 by Professor Bennett Lamond of the English Department, who retired in 2004. He brought a class out onto the green, where they read poetry and drank wine. Later that night some of the students returned, and Washington College's May Day celebration was born. Since then, May Day has become a two-day festival on April 30 and May 1, often involving public nudity by some of the student body. Most students use paint, glitter, and other forms of art to cover their bodies at this festival. The event draws many students as spectators. The college's Public Safety officers stand at the perimeter of the campus green to prevent students from being publicly indecent off campus grounds.

Athletics

Varsity sports

Washington College has competed in intercollegiate athletics since the 19th century.  Its oldest current varsity sports are the baseball team, which dates back to at least the early 1870s, and the men's basketball team, which played its 100th season in 2011–12. Men's teams are known as the Shoremen; women's teams are known as the Shorewomen.

While men have been playing varsity sports at Washington College for well over a century, varsity opportunities for women have been a more recent development. The first varsity sports for women – rowing, tennis, and volleyball – were added in the mid-1970s and were followed by the additions of softball, lacrosse, field hockey, and swimming by the mid-1980s. Varsity women's basketball began play during the 1993–94 season, while co-ed sailing was elevated to varsity status four years later. The women's soccer team is the college's newest varsity sport; it began play during the fall of 1998.

Washington College fielded a varsity football team through 1950, a men's track and field team through 1982, and a men's cross country team through 1989. The college previously sponsored varsity men's golf and varsity wrestling.

14 of Washington College's 18 varsity teams compete in the Centennial Conference. The men's and women's rowing teams compete in the Mid-Atlantic Rowing Conference (MARC), while the sailing team competes in the Middle Atlantic Intercollegiate Sailing Association (MAISA) of the Inter-Collegiate Sailing Association (ICSA).

The rowing and sailing teams host regattas on the Chester River and call the college's Truslow Boat House and Lelia Hynson Boating Park home.

The college's 18 varsity teams are:

Baseball (m)
Basketball (m, w)
Field hockey (w)
Lacrosse (m, w)
Rowing (m, w)
Sailing (co-ed)
Soccer (m, w) (see Shoremen soccer and Shorewomen soccer)
Softball (w)
Swimming (m, w)
Tennis (m, w)
Trap and skeet (co-ed)
Volleyball (w)

Lacrosse
The college is known for its men's lacrosse team. It won the 1998 NCAA Division III National Championship and a share of the 1954 USILA Laurie Cox Division National Championship. The men's lacrosse team has participated in the NCAA Division II or III Tournament 28 times since 1974 and the NCAA Division III Championship game eight times. Washington College Men's Lacrosse players have earned All-America honors 226 times.

The men's and women's lacrosse teams, men's and women's soccer teams, and field hockey teams, compete on Kibler Field at Roy Kirby, Jr. Stadium. Completed in 2006, the stadium was named one of the top 10 venues for collegiate lacrosse by Lacrosse Magazine.

Housing
There are 24 housing options located on campus. Freshmen are required to live on campus unless they permanently reside nearby and fill out required exemption forms. There are 5 freshmen dedicated residence halls on campus- Minta Martin Hall, Reid Hall, Queen Anne's House, Caroline House, and Kent House. The other 19 residence halls on campus are available for upperclassmen, and in some scenarios- some freshmen as well, some particular housing options are reserved for Greek life and some for specific areas of study. The remaining 19 residence halls are as follows: West Hall, Middle Hall, East Hall, Cullen Hall, Dorchester House, Cecil House, Talbot House, Chester Hall, Sassafrass Hall, Corsica Hall, Harford Hall, Garrett House, Anne Arundel House, Calvert House, Allegany House, Frederick House, Carroll House, Howard House, Montgomery House, St. Mary's House, Charles House, and Prince George's House.

Facilities
Middle, East and West Halls stand on the crest of a low hill (the terrace) at the center of campus. Middle Hall (built 1844) and East and West Halls (built 1854) hold a special place in the history of Washington College, as they are the oldest surviving campus buildings.  They serve as monuments to the original Common Building (completed in 1789), whose site they occupy.  They are all three-story buildings constructed of brick.

They were listed on the National Register of Historic Places in 1979.

They now function as follows:
East Hall – The International House is a three-floor coed building that serves as a home for students interested in international relation and foreign language study. This theme house has a faculty advisor.
Middle Hall – The Creative Arts House is a coed building for students interested in drama, music, visual art, literature, and the creative arts in general.
West Hall – The Science House is a three-floor coed building that serves as a home for students interested in the natural sciences. This theme house has a faculty advisor.

People

Principals and presidents

At least 31 people have been the principal or president of Washington College since 1782, four of whom have been interim. Of the 31 presidents only one, Joseph McLain, was an alumnus of the college and only one, Sheila Bair, was a woman. The presidents of the college have been drawn from a variety of areas including religion, military service, governmental service, and academia. Six Washington College presidents were ordained in the Episcopal Church or the Methodist Protestant Church before their term. Several were also the rector of either Emmanuel Parish or St. Paul's in Chestertown concurrent to their term as president. Washington College presidents have come from many parts of public life. Two were engaged in military service before their term and four were in public service. A singular president, Kurt M. Landgraf, was working in the private sector before his term. Most of the remaining presidents were academics before becoming president of the college. Two were presidents of other colleges, seven were academic administrators, five were faculty members at other colleges, and three were faculty members at Washington College before their terms.

Alumni

Alumni of Washington College includes two Governors of Maryland, a Governor of Delaware, four United States Senators, seven members of the United States House of Representatives, and nine State senators. Outside of the world of politics, nine alumni of Washington College played at least one game in Major League Baseball including Jake Flowers who was on two World Series winning teams. John Emory, the namesake of Emory University and Emory & Henry College, graduated from Washington College. Several alumni were successful writers including James M. Cain and Đỗ Nguyên Mai. Mary Adele France, who was the first president of St. Mary's College of Maryland, and Robert K. Crane, who discovered sodium-glucose cotransport, both found success in academia. H. Lawrence Culp Jr. has found success in business as the CEO of Danaher Corporation and the CEO of General Electric.

References

Notes

Citations

Bibliography

External links

 
 Official athletics website

 
Liberal arts colleges in Maryland
1782 establishments in Maryland
Educational institutions established in 1782
Universities and colleges in Kent County, Maryland
University and college buildings on the National Register of Historic Places in Maryland
Eastern Pennsylvania Rugby Union
National Register of Historic Places in Kent County, Maryland
Private universities and colleges in Maryland